Lauren Schmetterling (born August 3, 1988) is an American rower who won a total of four gold medals in the Women's eight competition at the 2013 World Rowing Championships, the 2014 World Rowing Championships, the 2015 World Rowing Championships and the 2016 Summer Olympics in Rio de Janeiro.

Born in Voorhees Township, New Jersey, Schmetterling grew up in Moorestown, New Jersey and graduated from Moorestown High School as part of the class of 2006. She graduated in 2010 from Colgate University with a degree in economics.

References

 Lauren Schmetterling at USRowing
 

1988 births
Living people
American female rowers
Colgate University alumni
Moorestown High School alumni
People from Moorestown, New Jersey
People from Voorhees Township, New Jersey
Sportspeople from Burlington County, New Jersey
World Rowing Championships medalists for the United States
Rowers at the 2016 Summer Olympics
Olympic gold medalists for the United States in rowing
Medalists at the 2016 Summer Olympics
21st-century American women